Robert Creigh Deeds (born January 4, 1958) is an American lawyer and politician serving as a member of the Senate of Virginia representing the 25th district since 2001. Previously, he was the Democratic nominee for Attorney General of Virginia in 2005 and Governor of Virginia in 2009. He was defeated in both of those races by Republican Bob McDonnell. Deeds lost by just 323 votes in 2005, but was defeated by a wide margin of over 17 percentage points in 2009. He was a member of the Virginia House of Delegates from 1992 to 2001.

Personal life
Deeds was born on January 4, 1958, in Richmond, Virginia. The name "Creigh" is a family surname, originating from Confederate sympathizer, David Creigh, a distant relative. His family moved early in his life to Bath County. After graduating from Bath County High School, Deeds enrolled in Concord College. He then entered the Wake Forest University School of Law, from which he received his Juris Doctor in 1984.

Deeds married Pamela Miller in February 1981. They divorced in February 2010, with an article in The Washington Post describing the marriage as "a casualty of a nearly 20-year pursuit of a lifelong ambition that kept [Deeds] away from home".

Deeds married Siobhan Gilbride Lomax of Lexington, Virginia, in June 2013.

Stabbing
On November 19, 2013, Deeds was stabbed multiple times at his home in Bath County, Virginia by his 24-year-old son, Gus, who then died by suicide. Deeds was initially reported to be in critical condition at University of Virginia Medical Center. Although a judge had issued an involuntary commitment order for Gus, and despite an intensive search, no available hospital bed could be found to provide him mental health treatment in the days before the attempted murder and he was released home without the ordered treatment.  As a consequence, several changes were made in the screening and admission process for people undergoing an emergency psychiatric examination in Virginia.  These changes include 2014 Virginia Senate Bill 260, sponsored by Deeds.

Political career

House of Delegates
Deeds won election to the Virginia House of Delegates 1991 by defeating incumbent Emmett Hanger in a 57%–41% victory. This started a nine-year career in the Virginia House of Delegates.

In the House of Delegates, Deeds introduced several legislative proposals, including introducing Megan's Law to the Virginia General Assembly, which was passed in 1998. Other legislation promoted by Deeds include environmental protection and anti-drug laws. In 1994 Deeds supported and was a major co-sponsor of George Allen's initiative to abolish parole for those convicted of a felony.

State Senate
Deeds won a special state senate election in 2001 to succeed Emily Couric, who had died of pancreatic cancer.
During Deeds' Senate tenure, legislation that Deeds proposed includes:
 SB150 – Requires that direct recording electronic devices be equipped to produce a contemporaneous paper record of each vote that can be verified by the voter and used in recounts. (2006)
 SB891 – Requires the board of visitors of each public two-year and four-year institution of higher education to provide reduced in-state tuition rates for the children of faculty and staff members employed by the institution, effective for the 2008–2009 academic year. (2007) Not enacted, rolled into SB982 and left in the Senate Finance Committee.
 SB34 – Increases the mandatory retirement age for judges from age 70 to age 75. (2008)
 SB669 – Permits ABC agents to check the national criminal database when conducting background checks on prospective licensees. (2008)

Deeds was also a proponent of a Senate resolution to close Virginia's gun show loophole, and made public appearances to generate support for the measure.

Attorney General campaign

In 2005, Deeds and John Edwards—a Virginia state senator from Roanoke—each announced that they planned to run for Attorney General of Virginia in the Democratic primary. Edwards later decided not to run, leaving Deeds as the sole candidate for the Democratic nomination for the office.

In the general election campaign, running against Republican nominee Bob McDonnell, Deeds ran on his record as a moderate Democrat who supported gun rights, strong punishment for criminals, and the death penalty. Deeds' stance on gun control included supporting a ban on semi-automatic firearms, but that did not prevent him from earning the endorsement of the NRA, which cited his patronage of a state constitutional amendment that guaranteed the right to hunt. McDonnell outspent Deeds by almost three million dollars (McDonnell spent $5,962,067 to Deeds' $3,103,585); $2,084,089 of McDonnell's campaign contributions were funneled through the Republican State Leadership Committee, exploiting a loophole in state law that was closed by the General Assembly shortly after the election.

The initial result of the vote was 49.96%–49.95%, with Deeds behind by fewer than 350 votes. Due to the closeness of the race's outcome, Deeds asked for a recount. Judge Theodore Markow of Richmond set the recount for December 20, 2005, a date so close to the inauguration that invitations to the event were mailed without a name for the attorney general to be inaugurated. The recount reaffirmed the earlier outcome, and McDonnell became attorney general.

Gubernatorial campaign

Deeds announced his intention to seek the Democratic nomination for governor on December 13, 2007. At the end of a close three-way race against former DNC chair Terry McAuliffe and former State Delegate Brian Moran, Deeds won by a large margin, taking about 50 percent of the vote in the June 9, 2009, Democratic Primary. He again faced McDonnell, the Republican nominee, in the November 2009 general election. McDonnell was selected at his party's nominating convention. Deeds lost the gubernatorial race by a wide margin to McDonnell, 41.25% to 58.61%.

Electoral history

To date, both of the elections Creigh Deeds has lost were to his 2005 Attorney General opponent Bob McDonnell, to whom he also lost in the 2009 Gubernatorial race.

Political positions

Taxes
In January 2009, Deeds proposed up to a $10,000 tax credit for businesses that made "job-creating investments" and supported exemption of the sales tax on the purchase of solar or wind energy systems for homeowners. He has stated that he will not make a no-tax-increase pledge and wrote in The Washington Post that he would support a new gas tax to fund transportation. In 2008, Deeds voted for a bill in the State Senate which would raise the Virginia gas tax $0.06 per gallon over the next 6 years.

Consumer advocacy
Deeds is in favor of tougher sanctions on lenders that deal subprime mortgages.

Death penalty
Deeds supports removing the "trigger-man" clause, which restricts the death penalty to those who physically committed the action, in Virginia capital punishment law. In 2005, Deeds said that he disagreed with the Supreme Court ruling in Roper v. Simmons, which made it unconstitutional to execute juveniles. He argued that it was the jury's duty to determine when and where the death penalty should come into play. In 2021, Deeds voted to abolish the death penalty in Virginia.

Gay marriage
In 2006, Deeds was part of the unanimous Democratic coalition that voted to oppose an amendment to the Virginia State Constitution that would ban same-sex marriage. He voted against it because he believed the Amendment went too far in its definition of marriage. In July 2009, Deeds stated he believed "Marriage is between a man and a woman" and declined to say gay marriage is a civil right.

Gun control
Deeds was endorsed by the NRA during his 2005 Attorney General run over Republican Bob McDonnell. Deeds supports a state ban on civilian ownership of assault weapons and signed a pledge to repeal the law restricting citizens from buying more than one handgun a month. The law was repealed by his opponent, Bob McDonnell in February 2012  He voted against the Castle Doctrine (Senate Bill 876) multiple times and previously proposed a measure that would eliminate private sales at gun shows. The bill's proponents called it a measure to prevent another disaster like the Virginia Tech massacre even though the shooter purchased his firearms from licensed gun dealers and not at a gun show. This measure ultimately failed. In February 2011, Deeds was one of eight senators on the Senate Courts of Justice Committee who "passed by indefinitely" House Bill 1573, defeating the bill by an 8 to 4 margin. In February 2020, Deeds broke party ranks to shelve House Bill 961 which would have prohibited the sale and transport of assault firearms, certain firearm magazines, silencers, and trigger activators. This effectively blocked the legislation championed by Gov. Northam.

Illegal immigration
Deeds voted to make undocumented immigrants ineligible for in-state tuition and state and local benefits. He voted in favor of designating English as the official language of the United States.

2010 redistricting
Deeds introduced SB926 to create a seven-member non-partisan committee to oversee the 2010–2011 redistricting plan. In 2009, the bill passed the State Senate, 39–0, but was killed by the House of Delegates' Committee on Privileges and Elections. In 2010, the bill once again passed the Senate with unanimous vote of 40–0 before once again being killed in committee by the House of Delegates. Deeds said that, if elected Governor of Virginia, he would use his veto power and amendment powers to try to force the House of Delegates into accepting a version of SB926.

Education
Deeds' 2009 gubernatorial campaign issued a plan called "Better Schools. Better Jobs" to detail Deeds' plans regarding education. The plan called for up to $15,000 in student loans for 4-year college students, and for creating partnerships with community colleges and traditional universities.

Transportation
Deeds was criticized by the McDonnell campaign for lacking a coherent transportation plan. During the second debate between the candidates, McDonnell held up a blank sheet of paper as a representation of the Deeds plan. Deeds later wrote a column in The Washington Post laying out his plan, which included the possibility of a new gas tax or other tax.

References

External links

 
 as R. Creigh Deeds
 as Creigh Deeds

1958 births
20th-century American politicians
21st-century American politicians
American Presbyterians
Concord University alumni
County and city Commonwealth's Attorneys in Virginia
Living people
Democratic Party members of the Virginia House of Delegates
People from Bath County, Virginia
Politicians from Richmond, Virginia
Stabbing attacks in the United States
Stabbing survivors
Virginia lawyers
Democratic Party Virginia state senators
Wake Forest University alumni
Washington and Lee University School of Law faculty